Küng (also written as Kueng) is a surname of German origin. Notable people with the surname include:

 Andres Küng (1945–2002), Swedish journalist, writer, entrepreneur and politician 
 Carmen Küng (born 1978), Swiss curler
 Hans Küng (1928–2021), German Catholic theologian
 Patrick Küng (born 1984), Swiss World Cup alpine ski racer
 Stefan Küng (born 1993), Swiss cyclist

See also
 J. Alexander Kueng, former police officer involved in the murder of George Floyd
 Kong (surname) (孔); Kung is a common transliteration of this Chinese name

Surnames of German origin